Jefferson Masonic Temple is a building completed in 1913 in Jefferson Park, it provides a meeting space for Masonic Lodges and appendant bodies in the 5th Northeastern District of the Grand Lodge Of Illinois: Paul Revere Lodge #998, Oriental Lodge #33, Hesperia #411, King Oscar Lodge #855, Kelvyn Park-Willing Lodge #1075 and Lux Lunae Lodge #1181.

In 1913, the Wiley M. Providence Lodge formed the Jefferson Masonic Association and built their new temple. King Oscar Lodge now maintains the Jefferson Masonic Temple.

See also 
 Masonic Temple (Chicago) Former Masonic buildings in Illinois
 Paul Revere Masonic Temple Former Masonic buildings in Illinois
 Masonic Landmarks ancient and unchangeable principles or precepts of Freemasonry
 Tracing board illustrations depicting the various emblems and symbols used by Freemasons

References 

Gaunt, Edward E. A Historical Account of the First 100 Years of Providence Lodge No. 711, A.F. & A.M. Chicago: Providence Lodge, c.1968 (typed printing c.1988). Chicago, Illinois [map]. 1910. Scale not given. “Chicago 1910.” Good City Group Chicago

External links 
 Paul Revere Lodge #998
 Oriental Lodge #33
 Hesperia Lodge #411
 King Oscar Lodge #855
 Kelvyn Park-Willing Lodge #1075
 Lux Lunae Lodge #1181

Masonic buildings completed in 1913
Buildings and structures in Chicago
Masonic buildings in Illinois
Organizations established in 1913
1913 establishments in Illinois